Murray Joseph Schisgal (November 25, 1926 – October 1, 2020) was an American playwright and screenwriter.

Life and career
Schisgal was born in Brooklyn, New York City. He was the son of Jewish immigrants, Irene (Sperling), a bank clerk, and Abraham Schisgal, a tailor. Schisgal won his first recognition for the 1963 off-Broadway double-bill The Typists and The Tiger, which received the Drama Desk Award. His 1965 Broadway debut, Luv, was nominated for a Tony Award for Best Play and for Best Author of a Play. Other credits include Jimmy Shine, 74 Georgia Avenue, Naked Old Man and All Over Town, which received a Drama Desk nomination.

Schisgal also wrote The Love Song of Barney Kempinski, which was the first presentation of ABC Stage 67, and the screenplay for The Tiger Makes Out. Along with Larry Gelbart, Schisgal co-wrote the screenplay for Tootsie, for which he was nominated for an Oscar, Golden Globe, and BAFTA, and for which he won awards from the Writers Guild of America, New York Film Critics Circle, National Society of Film Critics and the Los Angeles Film Critics Association.

Schisgal died on October 1, 2020, in Port Chester, New York, at the age of 93.

Filmography

References

External links

Murray Schisgal at doolee.com

American people of Russian-Jewish descent
American television writers
American male screenwriters
20th-century American dramatists and playwrights
Writers from Brooklyn
1926 births
2020 deaths
American male television writers
American male dramatists and playwrights
American Jews
20th-century American male writers
Screenwriters from New York (state)